Haenen is a surname. Notable people with the surname include:

Toby Haenen (born 1973), Australian swimmer
Paul Haenen (born 1946), Dutch comedian
Tony Haenen (1946–2015), Australian rules footballer
Giel Haenen (born 1934), Dutch footballer
Gitte Haenen (born 1986), Belgian Paralympic athlete

See also
Hanen